Digging is the act of removing solid material from a surface. Digging  may also refer to:

 "Digging", a poem by Seamus Heaney
 "Digging...", a poem by Gopi Kottoor

See also
 
 
 Diggings, a colloquial term for the gold rush locations in Australia and the United States
 Dig (disambiguation)